The 2015–16 Cal State Northridge Matadors men's basketball team represented California State University, Northridge (also known as CSUN) during the 2015–16 NCAA Division I men's basketball season. The Matadors, led by third year head coach Reggie Theus, played their home games at the Matadome as members of the Big West Conference. On January 7, 2016, CSUN announced a self-imposed postseason ban due to academic fraud violations. They postseason ban included the Big West tournament. They finished the season, 10–20, 5–11 in Big West play to finish in a tie for sixth place.

Roster

Schedule and results
Source: 

|-
!colspan=9 style="background:#231F20; color:#CD1041;"| Exhibition

|-
!colspan=9 style="background:#231F20; color:#CD1041;"| Non-conference regular season

|-
!colspan=9 style="background:#231F20; color:#CD1041;"| Big West regular season

References

Cal State Northridge Matadors men's basketball seasons
Cal State Northridge